Mount Brazil is a mountain,  high, at the south end of the McGregor Range in the Admiralty Mountains. It was mapped by the United States Geological Survey (USGS) from surveys and from U.S. Navy air photos, 1960–62, and named by the Advisory Committee on Antarctic Names for Chief Warrant Officer John D. Brazil, USA, helicopter pilot supporting the USGS Topo North–South party that surveyed the area, 1961–62.

References
 

Mountains of Victoria Land
Borchgrevink Coast